Gerardus Pieter Baerends (30 March 1916, The Hague – 1 September 1999, Groningen) was a Dutch biologist and one of the most important representatives of the so-called classical ethology in the tradition of Nikolaas Tinbergen and Konrad Lorenz. Baerends' behavioral working group was the first of this specialty in the Netherlands and is still regarded as one of the world's most prolific, since from it alone 43 theses emerged.

In 1958 he became member of the Royal Netherlands Academy of Arts and Sciences.

References 

1916 births
1999 deaths
20th-century Dutch zoologists
Ethologists
Academic staff of the University of Groningen
Leiden University alumni
Members of the Royal Netherlands Academy of Arts and Sciences
Scientists from The Hague